The Dover Patrol and later known as the Dover Patrol Force was a Royal Navy command of the First World War, notable for its involvement in the Zeebrugge Raid on 22 April 1918. The Dover Patrol formed a discrete unit of the Royal Navy based at Dover and Dunkirk for the duration of the First World War. Its primary task was to prevent enemy German shipping—chiefly submarines—from entering the English Channel en route to the Atlantic Ocean, thereby obliging the Imperial German Navy to travel via the much longer route around Scotland which was itself covered by the Northern Patrol.

History
In late July 1914, with war looming, 12 Tribal-class destroyers arrived at Dover to join the near obsolete destroyers already at anchor in the harbour, most of them built in the late 19th century. These destroyers formed the nucleus of the fledgling Dover Patrol, which, from its early beginnings as a modest and poorly equipped command, became one of the most important Royal Navy commands of the First World War.

The Dover Patrol was first officially established as an independent command on 12 October 1914 in response to the German capture of Antwerp and Zeebrugge, as well as the impending fall of Ostend. German possession of Belgian Channel ports and rising activity of U-Boats led the British Admiralty to consider the Dover Straits vital enough to be distinct from the Admiral of Patrols. The first actions of the Dover Patrol included bombarding German coastal positions during the Battle of the Yser and defeating a German Navy detachment in the Battle off Texel.

The Dover Patrol assembled cruisers, monitors, destroyers, armed trawlers and drifters, paddle minesweepers, armed yachts, Motor Launches and Coastal Motor Boats, submarines, seaplanes, aeroplanes and airships. With these resources it performed several duties simultaneously in the Southern North Sea and the Dover Straits: carrying out anti-submarine patrols; escorting merchantmen, hospital and troop ships; laying sea-mines and even constructing mine barrages; sweeping up German mines; bombarding German military positions on the Belgian coast and sinking U-boats. The Dover patrol was often attacked and took many casualties as in the action of 15 February 1918.

During the war, the Dover Patrol was maintained by the Dover Engineering Works, an Iron Foundry which employed and housed many hundreds of workers in Dover Town and was managed by Vivian Elkington, nephew of Walter Emden. The company still exists today, operating from a reduced premises at Holmestone Road, under the name of Gatic. In March 1919 the Dover Patrol was renamed Dover Patrol Force.

Commemoration

After the war, a fund was set up to erect a memorial to the Dover Patrol. In July 1921, a memorial at Leathercote Point near St Margaret's Bay was unveiled. Similar memorial obelisks stand at Cap Blanc Nez on the French channel coast, and at John Paul Jones Park near Fort Hamilton, overlooking New York harbour.

Admirals commanding
Post holders included:
 Rear-Admiral The Hon. Horace L. A. Hood, 12 October 1914  – 13 April 1915
 Vice-Admiral Sir Reginald H. S. Bacon, 13 April 1915  – 1 January 1918 
 Acting Vice-Admiral Sir Roger J. B. Keyes, 1 January 1918  – 20 March 1919 
 Vice-Admiral Cecil F. Dampier, 20 March 1919 – 15 October 1919

Other Senior officers associated with Dover

Rear-Admiral and Senior Officer, Dover 
Post holders included:
 Rear-Admiral Heathcoat S. Grant, 10 January 1917 – 18 June 1917 
 Rear-Admiral Cecil F. Dampier, 18 June 1917 – 1 June 1918, also Admiral-Superintendent, Dover

Senior Naval Officer, Dunkirk 
Post holders included:
 Commodore Charles Johnson, 13 December 1914 – 4 July 1917
 Commodore Hubert Lynes, 5 July 1917 – May 1918
 Commodore Frank Larken, June 1918

Senior Naval Officer Folkestone 
 Captain Pennant A. I. Lloyd, 30 October 1914 – 15 September 1916
 Rear-Admiral Bentinck J. D. Yelverton, 18 September 1916  – 21 October 1919 (retired)

Senior Naval Officer, Ramsgate 
Post holders included:
 Captain George N. Tomlin, 15 January 1915 – 28 May 1917
 Captain Walter L. Allen, 27 May 1917 – 25 March 1919

Board game
Dover Patrol was the name of a popular board-game, similar to L'Attaque, but based on naval warfare, devised by Harry A. Gibson in 1911.

See also

 Charles Lightoller
 Northern Patrol
 Operation Hush

References

Further reading
  Vol. 1 • Vol. 2

External links
 History of the Dover Patrol
 Excerpt from the First World War encyclopedia
 www.theotherside.co.uk 

Royal Navy patrols
Military units and formations of the Royal Navy in World War I
Military units and formations in Kent
Military units and formations in the Cinque Ports
Military history of Kent
Military history of Dover, Kent